Aedh mac Brian Ó Cellaigh, King of Ui Maine, died 1467.

Ó Cellaigh appears to have been the only son of Brian Ó Cellaigh (died 1393) and Edwina inion Cathal Oge O Conchobair (died 1393). On their deaths within a few months of each other, he was apparently cared for by his grandfather, king Maelsechlainn Ó Cellaigh (died 1402) and after his death, by his uncle, Uilliam Ruadh, tainiste of Ui Maine (died 1420). 

Aedh came to power in 1424 as a compromise candidate. Donnchadh Ó Cellaigh, king from 1410 and another uncle of Aedh, had attempted to suborn the sons of Uilliam Ruadh, which led to his death in an ambush by them. As his supporters would not accept one of Uilliam Ruadh's sons as king, Aedh advanced his claim and was successful.

References

 The Tribes and customs of Hy-Many, John O'Donovan, 1843
 The Parish of Ballinasloe, Fr. Jerome A. Fahey.
 The Surnames of Ireland, Edward MacLysaght, Dublin, 1978.
 A New History of Ireland - lists and genealogies, vol. 9, Oxford University Press, 1984.
 Dictionary of Irish Biography, pp. 592–94, Cambridge, 2010
 Annals of Ulster at CELT: Corpus of Electronic Texts at University College Cork
 Annals of Tigernach at CELT: Corpus of Electronic Texts at University College Cork
Revised edition of McCarthy's synchronisms at Trinity College Dublin.
 http://www.stirnet.com/main/index.php?option=com_wrapper&Itemid=79&startUrl=http://www.stirnet.com/HTML/genie/british/kk/kelly01.htm

People from County Galway
People from County Roscommon
15th-century Irish monarchs
Aedh
Kings of Uí Maine